Michał Rogalski (born 23 June 1987) is a Polish badminton player. He competed at the 2015 and 2019 European Games.

Achievements

BWF International Challenge/Series (2 titles, 6 runners-up) 
Men's singles

Men's doubles

  BWF International Challenge tournament
  BWF International Series tournament
  BWF Future Series tournament

References

External links 
 

1987 births
Living people
Sportspeople from Wrocław
Polish male badminton players
Badminton players at the 2015 European Games
Badminton players at the 2019 European Games
European Games competitors for Poland